Laura Burns may refer to:

Laura J. Burns, American writer
Laura Burns (Hollyoaks), fictional villainess from the British soap Hollyoaks
Laura Burns, played Molly Kelly in the 1991 film The Ballad of the Sad Café